is a former Japanese long-distance runner who competed in marathons.

On June 12, 1965, Shigematsu set a world's best in the marathon with a time of 2:12:00 at the Polytechnic Marathon. Less than two months earlier, he had set a course record at the 1965 Boston Marathon (2:16:33).
In his career, in 22 marathons started, he recorded 6  victories, placed second 3 times and third once. Shigematsu ran seven marathons under 2:20.

Marathons
All results regarding marathon, unless stated otherwise

References

1940 births
Living people
Japanese male long-distance runners
Japanese male marathon runners
Asian Games medalists in athletics (track and field)
Athletes (track and field) at the 1966 Asian Games
World record setters in athletics (track and field)
Boston Marathon male winners
Asian Games silver medalists for Japan
Medalists at the 1966 Asian Games